WYQE (92.9 FM), branded on-air as Yunque 92.9fm, is a radio station broadcasting a Spanish Variety format. Licensed to Naguabo, Puerto Rico, it serves the Puerto Rico area.  The station is currently owned by JN Music Group, a subsidiary of HMS Distributors, and the licensee is Fajardo Broadcasting Company, Inc..

External links

YQE
Radio stations established in 1994
1994 establishments in Puerto Rico
Naguabo, Puerto Rico